Naomie Feller (born 6 November 2001) is a French professional footballer who plays as a forward for Spanish Primera División club Real Madrid and the France national team.

Club career
On 10 July 2022, Feller joined Primera División club Real Madrid.

International career
Feller is a former French youth international. She was part of French squad which won 2019 UEFA Women's Under-19 Championship. She made her senior team debut on 22 October 2021 in a 11–0 FIFA World Cup qualifier win against Estonia.

Career statistics

International

Scores and results list France's goal tally first, score column indicates score after each Feller goal.

Honours
Reims
 Division 2 Féminine: 2018–19

Lyon
 Division 1 Féminine: 2019–20
 Coupe de France Féminine: 2019–20
 UEFA Women's Champions League: 2019–20
France U19
 UEFA Women's Under-19 Championship: 2019

References

External links
 
 Naomie Feller at footofeminin.fr 
 

2001 births
Living people
Women's association football forwards
French women's footballers
France women's youth international footballers
France women's international footballers
Division 1 Féminine players
Division 2 Féminine players
Stade de Reims Féminines players
Olympique Lyonnais Féminin players
Real Madrid Femenino players
French expatriate sportspeople in Spain
Expatriate women's footballers in Spain
Black French sportspeople
Footballers from Paris
French expatriate women's footballers